Stay Awake is an 2022 American drama film, written and directed by Jamie Sisley, in his directorial debut. It stars Wyatt Oleff, Fin Argus, Albert Jones, Cree Cicchino, Quinn McColgan and Chrissy Metz. The film had its world premiere at the 72nd Berlin International Film Festival on February 12, 2022 and the 48th Deauville American Film Festival on September 6, 2022.

Plot
Two brothers navigate teenage life, while dealing with their mother's prescription drug addiction.

Cast
 Wyatt Oleff as Ethan 
 Fin Argus as Derek
 Albert Jones  as Dennis
 Cree Cicchino as Melanie
 Quinn McColgan as Ashley
 Chrissy Metz as Michelle
 Lorrie Odom as Vicki

Production
In July 2021, it was announced Wyatt Oleff, Fin Argus, Chrissy Metz, Cree Cicchino, Quinn McColgan and Lorrie Odom had joined the cast of the film, with Jamie Sisley directing from a screenplay he wrote.

Release
It had its world premiere at the 72nd Berlin International Film Festival on February 12, 2022, where it received a Special Mention for Best Film and won the German Art House Cinema award.

It also had its world at the 48th Deauville American Film Festival on September 6, 2022, where Jamie Sisley received the Deauville Grand Special Prize nominee.

References

External links
 

American drama films
2022 films
2022 directorial debut films
Films about drugs
2022 drama films
2020s English-language films
2020s American films